Two ships of the United States Navy have borne the name USS Gunston Hall, in honor of Gunston Hall.

She was sold to Argentina, renamed ARA Candido de Lasala (Q-43), decommissioned in 1981, and scrapped

United States Navy ship names